Lawrence Yum Sin Ling (born 1948) was a member of the Hong Kong Legislative Council from 1995 to 1997 and a district councillor for Kowloon City District of Hong Kong from 1994 to 1997 (Prince constituency). He is a founding member of a pro-Republic of China (Taiwan) political organisation 123 Democratic Alliance.

Yum contested in the Hong Kong Legislative Council election in 1998, but was unelected.

His son, Edward Yum, is a political activist in Hong Kong.

References

District councillors of Kowloon City District
123 Democratic Alliance politicians
HK LegCo Members 1995–1997
1948 births
Living people
National Cheng Kung University alumni